Nasser Khaleghi is an Iranian reformist politician. He served as a lawmaker and labour minister.

References

Living people
Year of birth missing (living people)
Government ministers of Iran
Islamic Iran Participation Front politicians
Iran–Iraq War prisoners of war
Iranian prisoners of war
Prisoners of war held by Iraq